Pologoye Zaymishche is a rural locality (a selo) and the administrative center of Pokrovsky Selsoviet of Akhtubinsky District, Astrakhan Oblast, Russia. The population was 1,035 as of 2010. There are 37 streets.

Geography 
Pologoye Zaymishche is located 29 km northwest of Akhtubinsk (the district's administrative centre) by road. Solyanka is the nearest rural locality.

References 

Rural localities in Akhtubinsky District